Upstage may refer to:

UpStage, an open source server-side application that has been purpose built for cyberformance
Upstage (film), (also known as The Mask of Comedy) is a 1926 American silent romantic drama film
The Upstage Gallery, features artists from Topeka, Kansas and the surrounding areas since February 2007
Upstage (magazine), a free monthly publication founded by Gary Wien that covered arts and entertainment in New Jersey, US
Upstage (stage position), in theatre, the rear of the stage area, farthest from the audience, is upstage
"Upstaging" refers to background actors drawing attention away from featured actors.
The Upstage Club, a now closed influential music venue in Asbury Park, New Jersey